Wudinna District Council is a rural local government area on central Eyre Peninsula, South Australia. The district's economy is largely driven by agriculture, mainly cereal crops, with beef and sheep commonly farmed as well.

History
The District Council of Minnipa was established on 28 May 1925. Its boundaries were defined as including the hundreds of Minnipa, Yaninee, Pygery, Wudinna, Palabie, Wannamana, Mamblin, Warramboo, Kappakoola, Pordia and Cocata in the County of Le Hunte, and the hundreds of Condada, Moorkitabie, Carina, Addison and Travers in the County of Robinson, the latter five hundreds being annexed from the District Council of Streaky Bay. The inaugural councillors appointed were Charles James Rowen, Arthur William Christian, William Mitchell, Thomas Knight, Edwin James Turley, Ellery John Drummond Oswald, and Edward Beck Smith.

It was renamed the District Council of Le Hunte in 1932, after Sir George Ruthven Le Hunte, who as Governor of South Australia had proclaimed the County of Le Hunte in 1908.

It was again renamed on 24 April 2008 as Wudinna District Council.

Localities

The district encompasses a number of towns and localities, including Cocata, Koongawa, Kyancutta, Minnipa, Pygery, Warramboo, Wudinna and Yaninee, Karcultaby, Mount Damper and Pinkawillinie. The former locality of Paney, which was a small portion of the present bounded locality of Gawler Ranges, is also in Wudinna council area. Paney was merged into the Gawler Ranges locality when the latter's boundaries were formalised in April 2013.

Facilities
The area has a number of sporting facilities with football, cricket, tennis and bowls all popular pastimes. Swimming pools are also located at Wudinna and Minnipa. The district also has a number of schools and a hospital.

Elected members

Mayors and chairmen of the District Council of Le Hunte/Wudinna

 Ernest Harry Edmonds (1931–1939)
 Alfred William Hurtle Barns (1939–1941)
 Ernest Harry Edmonds (1941–1944)
 David Trevenen Sampson (1944–1946)
 Philip Warburton Symonds (1946–1947)
 Harold Edward Broad (1947–1950)
 Oswald John Murphy (1950–1951)
 Victor Melrose Karger (1951–1952)
 William Maxwell Heath (1952–1958)
 Percy Archibald Tonkin (1958–1959)
 George Harnet Phillips (1959–1965)
 William Leonard Wilkins (1965–1976)
 Eric Markey (1976–1977)
 Murray Murvin Gerschwitz (1977–1979)
 Newton Lloyd Simpson (1979–1982)
 Murray Murvin Gerschwitz (1982–1987)
 Tim Scholz (2003–2013)
 Eleanor Scholz (2013–present)

References

External links
Council website
Local Government Association of South Australia website

Wudinna, District Council of
Eyre Peninsula